Trust is a 1990 American romantic black comedy film written and directed by Hal Hartley and starring Adrienne Shelly and Martin Donovan. Two young misfits, both in emotional shock, meet in a Long Island town and through trials develop a platonic relationship based on mutual attraction and trust.

Plot
When naïve and unbookish Maria announced to her family that she had dropped out of high school because of an unplanned pregnancy, her father died of heart failure, her mother kicked her out, and her boyfriend broke up with her. She meets Matthew, a highly educated and extremely moody electronics repairman who keeps losing jobs through inability to accept the views of employers and customers. He offers her a room in the house of his sadistic father, who kicks both of them out. Braving the wrath of her ferocious mother, Maria then goes home with Matthew who, though they never do more than kiss, offers to get a good job, marry her, and bring up her child. But it is not to be. Matthew's father and Maria's mother both try to destroy the innocent relationship and the young people both crack under the strain. Maria has an abortion and Matthew, in despair, tries to blow himself up at the plant where he works. Maria's last sight of him is in a police car as he is driven away.

Cast
 Adrienne Shelly as Maria Coughlin
 Martin Donovan as Matthew Slaughter
 Merritt Nelson as Jean Coughlin
 John MacKay as Jim Slaughter
 Edie Falco as Peg Coughlin
 Karen Sillas as Nurse Paine

Release
The film premiered at the Toronto Festival of Festivals on September 9, 1990 and was released in theatres on July 26, 1991.

References

External links
 Trust at Halhartley.com
 
 

1990 films
American independent films
1990 romantic comedy films
Films directed by Hal Hartley
Films shot in New York (state)
American romantic comedy films
Republic Pictures films
1990 independent films
1990s English-language films
1990s American films